Danielle Thompson (born 22 August 1983) is a British actress, glamour model and TV presenter best known for her appearances in the Daily Sport and Sunday Sport newspapers.

Early life
Thompson was born in Australia (in Penrith, New South Wales, on the fringe of Sydney). At the age of 2, her family relocated to Norwich, England.

Career
Thompson started her professional modelling career featuring in the Daily Sport and Sunday Sport. She later appeared in British lads' magazines such as Nuts, Zoo Weekly, Loaded, Maxim and FHM; as well as gossip magazines New and Heat.

Deciding to pursue a career in acting, Thompson attended The International School Of Screen Acting, obtaining a Post Grad Diploma in Screen Acting in 2010. She has appeared in several feature films, including as a scream queen in British indie horror films.

During 2012, Thompson completed writing her first screenplay, originally titled Call Me, drawing partly on her experience as a model. Now renamed Serial Kaller, the film was shot in 2013. That year also saw Thompson film Axe to Grind, Cute Little Buggers and Rockband Vs Vampires.

At the beginning of 2014 Christmas Slay was filmed in Bulgaria.

Filmography

 The Fixer (2009 - TV series) (Played Keeley)
 Just For The Record (2009) (Played Rapture)
 Brighton Rock (2010) (Played a ‘60s model)
 Riot (2010) (Played Kerry)
 How to Stop Being a Loser (2010) (Played Bambi)
 Monitor (2011) (Played Nurse A Price)
 Three's a Shroud (2012)
 Deadly Spectrum (2011) (Mary Rouge)
 Please Hold (2011 - Video short) (Bexi)
 No Strings 2 (2011 - not yet released) (Plays Mistress Pain)
 Forest of the Damned 2 (2011) (Angel)
 O31:Don't Fear the Reaper (2012)
 Big Pink (2012) (Sapphire)
 G.B.H. (2012) (Abi)
 The Fall of the Essex Boys (2013) (Casey)
 Zombie Women of Satan 2 (2013) (Zara)
 Convention of the Dead (2013) (Slave girl zombie)
 Axe to Grind (2013) (Nikki)
 Serial Kaller (2014) (Tanya)
 Christmas Slay (2014) (Beccy)
 Pumpkins (2018) (Pam)

References

External links 
 
 

1983 births
Living people
Page 3 girls
British film actresses
British people of Australian descent
Australian expatriates in England
Glamour models
Actors from Norwich